Robat-e Olya (also Romanized as Robāţ-e ‘Olyā and Robāt Olyā) is a village in Khorram Dasht Rural District, Kamareh District, Khomeyn County, Markazi Province, Iran. At the 2006 census, its population was 67, in 14 families.

References 

Populated places in Khomeyn County